Tell ej-Judeideh is a tell in modern Israel, lying at an elevation of  above sea-level. The Arabic name is thought to mean, "Mound of the dykes." In Modern Hebrew, the ruin is known by the name Tell Goded.

It has tentatively been identified with the biblical Moresheth-Gath, while others think that it might be Ashan of Joshua 15:42, based on the name's proximity to Libnah (thought by Albright to possibly be Tel Burna) and to Ether, a site now recognized as Khirbet el-Ater (grid position 138/113PAL).

Members of the Palestine Exploration Fund visited the site in the late 19th-century and described seeing there "foundations, heaps of stones, and a cistern."

History
Based on its archaeological finds, the site at Tell ej-Judeideh was inhabited in early pre-Israelite times, during the Middle and Late Bronze Age, and again during the Kingdom of Judah (contemporary with the Philistines), and later fortified during the Roman period, or even perhaps later.

The region wherein the ruin lies was formerly inhabited by the Philistines, and later captured by the Israelite tribes during the period of the monarchy. With the expulsion of the Israelites during the Assyrian and Chaldean military expeditions, the region was then settled by Idumeans (later turned Jews), followed by other ethnicities, the most prominent of whom being Arabic speaking peoples.

Identification
Scholars are divided as to the likely identification of the site. Israeli archaeologist Y. Aharoni, relying upon Eusebius' Onomasticon where he fixes the ancient site of Gath near the Roman road 5 miles (8 km) from Eleutheropolis (Beth Gubrin) on the way to Diospolis (Lod), thought that Gath was to be identified with Tell ej-Judeideh, and that Gath and Moresheth-Gath were one and the same place. Others have speculated that Tell ej-Judeideh might be either the biblical Libnah or Gederah of 1 Chronicles 4:23 and Joshua 15:36. Still, others, by a similarity of its name, think that the tell's Arabic name might be a corruption of the name Gedud of Micah 4:14, based on the view that in the Arabic toponyms for ancient sites, the Arab name often preserves the ancient Hebrew name.

In spite of all these attempts of identification, any recognition of a given site will depend upon the positive identification of that site. In this case, Tell ej-Judeideh has yet to be positively identified, as all identifications are only tentative.

Description of site
Tell ej-Judeideh is a natural hill with a level top surrounded on all sides by steep declivities, affording a natural defensive position against attacks. In addition to its natural defenses, the site was formerly surrounded by a late fortification wall, of which only one course of stones remains (now buried in débris), with an occasional area of 2 or 3 courses of stones. Stones and rubble used for the wall were laid without mortar. Gateways were found at the north, south, and east, while there are signs of an additional fourth gate that once stood on the city's west side. The lower, stone threshold of each gate was made with grooves for inserting an iron bolt, used to lock the gates at night, or in times of emergency.

In the center of the site stands a natural eminence consisting of a complex of structures, believed by Bliss to have once been a Roman villa, replete with pillars that had been torn down, and thought to have served as an atrium and impluvium. As one entered the city from its south side, there was a "paved causeway" leading through the center of the town directly to the central structure. The residential area of the city stretched along the north and south axis of the tell where the rock is practically level, divided only by the raised central part, as it was naturally higher than all the rest. The same residential area once consisted of small houses and recall, according to Bliss, "the labyrinthine Coptic towns on Elephantine and Philac," perhaps a sign of the town's Philistine origins.

Bliss and Macalister who excavated the site in 1900 counted 24 towers that projected inward from the inward face of the wall. Two towers flanked each of the four gates for a total of 8 towers. The remaining 16 other towers were, in the words of Bliss, "mere buttresses of solid masonry." It is to be noted that in N. Na'aman's reconstruction of Sennacherib's letter describing his military exploits in Palestine, the Philistine city of Gath is mentioned as being "surrounded with great towers," and which city "stood out on a ridge."

Archaeological finds 
Excavations at the site revealed three major levels in the sub-strata: the first and earliest being a Canaanite level (Middle Bronze); the second being Israelite (Iron II); and the third being Hellenistic-Roman.

Other finds discovered on the site include 37 jar handles with the sealed impression of le-melekh (= "for the king"), dating to the early Israelite period. One seal stamped on a jar handle reads in the Paleo-Hebrew script:  = Hošeaʻ Ṣefan; the first name Hošeaʻ written above and the second name Ṣefan written below, separated by a double horizontal line. Another private stamp impressed in Paleo-Hebrew characters shows the name Menaḥem Lebanah. These artefacts were initially kept at the Imperial Museum of Antiquities in Jerusalem, but, later, casts would be made of the originals and the originals sent to Istanbul, at the behest of the Ottoman authority, with only the casts remaining in Jerusalem. Today, they are at the Istanbul Archaeology Museums.

C. Clermont-Ganneau's discovery of the location of the biblical Gezer at Tell el-Jezer led to the cessation of archaeological work at Tell ej-Judeideh for one season, as the newly discovered site was given preferred treatment, and had already begun to yield important archaeological finds.

Recreational trail
Tel Godad is one of the most visited sites in the Judean lowlands, and is included along the Israel National Trail. A system of subterranean hiding places, burial niches (kūkhīm), and an ancient well (Bir Rasaq) at the southeastern foot of the archaeological site make it a prominent tourist attraction. The site is criss-crossed by marked hiking trails and many bicycle paths. The site is barred to motor-vehicles, in an attempt to encourage re-vegetation of the natural flora, but may be accessed by foot ascent from the base of the archaeological mound. Access to the site is via road 38 (Beit Shemesh-Beit Guvrin), about 4 kilometers west of Moshav Nahusha.

Gallery

References

Bibliography

 (original Hebrew edition: 'Land of Israel in Biblical Times - Historical Geography', Bialik Institute, Jerusalem (1962))

External links
 Survey of Western Palestine, Map 20: IAA, Wikimedia commons

Archaeological sites in Israel
Ancient Jewish settlements of Judaea
Philistine cities
Bronze Age sites in Israel
Tells (archaeology)
Geography of Palestine (region)